Russelia is a genus of flowering plants in the plantain family, Plantaginaceae. It is sometimes placed in the families Scrophulariaceae or Veronicaceae. The name honours Scottish naturalist Alexander Russell (1715–1768). Members of the genus are commonly known as firecracker plants or coralblows.  Russelia species grow in many parts of the world and are mildly drought resistant.

Russelia equisetiformis and Russelia sarmentosa are commonly used to hide unattractive retaining walls or fences because they grow quickly and have dense foliage. As evergreens they bloom for most of the year.

Due to their attractively coloured flowers, these bushes attract birds and insects (such as bees) that feed on flower nectar.

Selected species

Sources

References

External links
 Coral Plant

Plantaginaceae
Plantaginaceae genera